Monster-Mania Con is a semi-annual horror film and memorabilia fan convention held in Cherry Hill, New Jersey, Hunt Valley, Maryland, and Oaks, Pennsylvania, United States since 2003. It is mainly focused on its guest panels, where fans can meet horror movie actors. It is a three-day event held at the DoubleTree Hotel (formerly Crowne Plaza and later Cherry Hill Hotel) in Cherry Hill, New Jersey, Delta Hotel Marriott in Hunt Valley, Maryland, and The Greater Philadelphia Expo Center in Oaks, Pennsylvania.

History
During a car ride, Dave Hagan and his son were building the idea of a horror convention. By the end of the ride, the two had come up with the main structure for Monster-Mania. Monster-Mania was founded in 1999 by Dave Hagan, through Dave Hagan Enterprises, dedicated to the memory of Hagan's father, who introduced him to horror movies. Its first convention was held on late 2003, in Clarion Hotel and Conference Center in Cherry Hill, New Jersey. The lineup included Doug Bradley (who would become a regular for Monster-Mania Con), Caroline Munro, Ben Chapman, Veronica Carlson, amongst many others. Monster-Mania Con was cancelled in 2020 due to the COVID-19 pandemic, and was hosted outdoors in Oaks, Pennsylvania on May 22, 2021.

Events
Monster-Mania Con's main focus is on its guest panels, where one can meet actors primarily from horror-related media (e.g. Nick Castle, the actor who first portrayed Michael Myers in the Halloween franchise). There are also film presentations, previews, photo ops, music performances, and Q&As with select guests, along with an auction for Yorkie dogs.

Locations and dates

References

External links
Official website

Horror conventions